Pokrovka is a rural locality (a village) in Mayadykovsky Selsoviet, Dyurtyulinsky District, Bashkortostan, Russia. The population was 10 as of 2010. There is 1 street.

Geography 
Pokrovka is located 40 km north of Dyurtyuli (the district's administrative centre) by road. Atachevo is the nearest rural locality.

References 

Rural localities in Dyurtyulinsky District